The Dismac D8000 was the first personal computer manufactured in Brazil, and in 1980 it was the first Brazilian clone of TRS-80 Model I computer.

It used a 2 MHz Zilog Z80A microprocessor, with 16Kb of random access memory and 16Kb of read-only memory. The video output was through a PAL-M television with 16×32/64 within text mode and 48×128 points within the graphic mode. The keyboard contained 51 keys and was stored in the same case as the cassette recorder and the processor unit. The BASIC used was Level II, which was in the 16Kb of the ROM. Nowadays it is very rare even in Brazilian vintage computer market.

References

External links 
 Clube Old Bits - Brazilian site dedicated to the Brazilian vintage computers (in Portuguese only).
 Clube Old Bits - Dismac D8000 description and photo

Computers designed in Brazil
Z80-based home computers
TRS-80